The 2018–19 Western Sydney Wanderers W-League season was their seventh season in the W-League, the premier competition for women's football in Australia. The team played home games both at Marconi Stadium and ANZ Stadium and was managed by Dan Barrett.

Players

Current squad
Last updated 24 November 2018.

Transfers in

Transfers out

W-League

League table

Fixtures

Results summary

Results by round

References

Western Sydney Wanderers FC (A-League Women) seasons